Grant Township is one of twelve townships in Caldwell County, Missouri, and is part of the Kansas City metropolitan area with the USA.  As of the 2000 census, its population was 1,224.

Grant Township was established in 1870, and named after Ulysses S. Grant, 18th President of the United States.

Geography
It contains five cemeteries: Dixon, Dunkard, Estes, Wiley and Zimmerman.

References

External links
 US-Counties.com
 City-Data.com

Townships in Caldwell County, Missouri
Townships in Missouri
1870 establishments in Missouri